This was the first edition of the tournament as a WTA 125 tournament.

Elisabetta Cocciaretto defeated Magda Linette in the final, 7–6(7–5), 4–6, 6–1 to win the inaugural women's singles tennis title at the 2022 Abierto Tampico Open.  This was Cocciaretto's first WTA 125 title.

Seeds

Draw

Finals

Top half

Bottom half

Qualifying

Seeds

Qualifiers

Qualifying draw

First qualifier

Second qualifier

Third qualifier

Fourth qualifier

References

External links 
Main draw
Qualifying draw

Abierto Tampico – Singles